KLUP (930 AM) – branded 930AM The Answer – is a commercial conservative talk radio station licensed to serve Terrell Hills, Texas. Owned by the Salem Media Group, the station covers the San Antonio metropolitan area. The KLUP studios and transmitter are both located in San Antonio. Besides a standard analog transmission, KLUP is available online. Current station staff includes Chad Gammage - General Manager, Chris Lair - Operations Director, and Barry Besse - Program Director.

History
On October 17, 1947, the station first signed on as KITE in San Antonio, owned by Charles A. Balthrope and was a 1,000 watt daytimer, required to go off the air at night. In the 1950s, the power was boosted and the station was authorized to stay on the air around the clock, running the current 5,000 watts by day and 1,000 watts at night.

In May 1960, KITE was acquired by the Townsend U.S. International Growth Fund.  An advertisement in the 1960 edition of Broadcasting Yearbook described KITE as "The Adults Favorite Station in San Antonio." Later in the 1960s, KITE's city of license was moved from San Antonio to Terrill Hills. In 1966, it signed on an FM station, 104.5 KITE-FM (now KZEP). Both stations were owned by Doubleday, a large publishing and broadcasting corporation. Doubleday put progressive rock on the FM station, changing the call sign to KEXL, while KITE remained with its middle of the road music format.

In 1978, KITE was acquired by Lone Star Broadcasting, becoming KCCW. It later came under the ownership of Radio Alamo and again changed its call letters, this time to KLLS.  It was paired up with FM 100.3, which became KLLS-FM. The two stations simulcast as "Klassy 100 FM."

In 1990, the station became KISS, known as "Kool 930 AM." At first, it ran a satellite delivered oldies format, but later was simulcast with KISS-FM, airing a locally produced and hosted oldies format. In 1992, the Rusk Corporation paid $3.95 million for KISS-AM-FM. KISS-FM returned to its original rock format, while the format on KISS switched to syndicated adult standards as KLUP "The Loop."

In 1997, Cox Radio acquired KLUP, keeping the standards format. Three years later, Cox spun off KLUP to current owner Salem Media Group, who switched KLUP to a talk radio format a short time later.

Programming 
KLUP's schedule features programming from the Salem Radio Network, including Hugh Hewitt, Mike Gallagher, Dennis Prager, Charlie Kirk,  Sebastian Gorka and Brandon Tatum. Other National hosts include  Del Walmsley, Jay Sekulow, and Todd Starnes.

References

External links

LUP
News and talk radio stations in the United States
Radio stations established in 1987
Salem Media Group properties